Neal Chatha (born 8 September 1991), known by his stage name The PropheC, is an Indo-Canadian singer, songwriter, and record producer. His debut album, Forever, was released in 2011, and contained one of his first hit single "Sohni". Since then, he has released four more studio albums: Futureproof (2014), The Lifestyle (2016), The Season (2019) and Solace (2021), and a mixtape titled The Dream Room (2013). Chatha is the founder of his own record label,

Early life 
The PropheC first started singing at age five and was classically trained soon after. By age of 16, he began producing his own beats and original songs in his basement. After writing his first official song, "Sohni", he decided he could turn his passion into a career. While pursuing his ambitions in music, he also completed his education, earning a degree from Mount Royal University in business marketing.

Career 
The PropheC attributes his inspiration to be from all varieties of music, notably figures from both the South Asian music industry such as A. R. Rahman, Nusrat Fateh Ali Khan, and Western music, particularly Drake. Since the launch of his career, he has collaborated with artists such as Mickey Singh, Raxstar, Ziqboi (rapper), Fateh, Jus Reign, Amrit Maan, Sidhu Moose Wala and Ikka. The PropheC has toured in Europe and North America. He has also performed in India.

Discography

Studio albums 
Forever (2011)
Futureproof (2014)
The Lifestyle (2016)
The Season (2019)
Solace (2021)

Film soundtrack
 Selfiee  (2023)

Mixtapes 
The Dream Room (2013)

Singles

As Songwriter/Producer

References

External links
 

Canadian people of Indian descent
Canadian male singer-songwriters
Canadian singer-songwriters
Year of birth missing (living people)
Living people
Musicians from Calgary
Punjabi-language lyricists